Todor Kozlovski (born 28 June 1933) is a Bulgarian former sports shooter. He competed at the 1960 Summer Olympics and the 1964 Summer Olympics.

References

1933 births
Living people
Bulgarian male sport shooters
Olympic shooters of Bulgaria
Shooters at the 1960 Summer Olympics
Shooters at the 1964 Summer Olympics
Sportspeople from Sofia
20th-century Bulgarian people